Stigmella perplexa is a moth of the genus Stigmella and the family Nepticulidae. It was described by Anthonie Johannes Theodorus Janse in 1948. This species of moth is found in Namibia.

References

Nepticulidae
Moths of Africa
Moths described in 1948